The Progress AI-22 is a turbofan engine, developed by ZMKB Progress, Motor Sich JSC, KMPO and KAPO.

Development 
The AI-22 was developed in the 1990s and is designed for the Tupolev Tu-324 regional airliner.

The engine is based on a gas generator version of the DV-2 engine. It has a modular design consisting of 10 modules. Materials and special coatings of parts allow the engine to operate in various climatic conditions.

A successful start of a full-size engine was made on September 26, 2000. Further development of the engine is suspended indefinitely.

Organisation
The AI-22 is created in a cooperation of four enterprises:

ZMKB Progress is tasked with the manufacturing of external piping and cabling. It also conducts tests and performs the final assembly of the engine.
Motor Sich JSC is tasked with the manufacturing of the high-pressure compressor, combustion chamber, high-pressure turbine, air starter, air separator, start valve, air bypass valve, parts for piping, and fasteners used in the assembly of the engine.
KMPO is tasked with the manufacturing of the low-pressure compressor and fan, the low-pressure turbine, middle and rear support, transmission units, engine mountings, and oil system units.
KAPO is tasked with the manufacturing of the thrust reverser, jet nozzle, and cowlings.

Emissions
The specific emissions of the engine during the landing and takeoff cycle are as follows:
CO = 110 g/kN
HC = 12 g/kN
NOx = 45 g/kN
SN = 20 g/kN

Applications 
Tupolev Tu-324 (proposed) 
Yakovlev Yak-48 (proposed)

Specifications (AI-22)

See also

References 

Ivchenko-Progress aircraft engines
2000s turbofan engines